Cyperus plurinervosus is a species of sedge that is native to parts of the Central African Republic.

See also 
 List of Cyperus species

References 

plurinervosus
Plants described in 1952
Flora of the Central African Republic